Papeda may refer to:
 Papeda (food), a staple food of eastern Indonesia
 Papeda (citrus), common name for many unpalatable slow-growing Citrus, all formerly grouped as a single subgenus
 Ichang Papeda, a genetically pure hardy species of citrus papeda